Roque de la Cruz (born 13 December 1964) is a Spanish former professional racing cyclist. He rode in three editions of the Tour de France, one edition of the Giro d'Italia and two editions of the Vuelta a España.

References

External links
 

1964 births
Living people
Spanish male cyclists
Sportspeople from the Province of Albacete
Cyclists from Castilla-La Mancha